"Breakout" is a song by Foo Fighters. It is the second track and fourth single from their third album There Is Nothing Left to Lose.

History
The single was released as a two disc set in the UK and Europe, and also had separate releases in the Netherlands, Australia and Japan. Promotional singles were also released in the US for radio play.

The song appeared as a playable track in Lego Rock Band.

Music video
The video was directed by The Malloys, and served as a tie-in to the song's appearance in the film Me, Myself & Irene. It mainly features Dave Grohl playing a character who has a "multiple personality" disorder (just like Charlie Baileygates/Hank, Jim Carrey's character in the film) while taking his girlfriend to see the movie at a drive-in. In addition to Grohl's mom, Ginny, as the woman who flips him off while he is driving, the video also features some of the actors from the Me, Myself & Irene including Traylor Howard, who played Charlie's ex-wife Layla, and Tony Cox, who played the limo driver, along with Anthony Anderson, who played Jamal Baileygates & Jerod Mixon who played Shonté Jr. Baileygates. The MTV series Making the Video documented the making of the music video.

Live recordings 
A live version recorded on November 23, 1999, at the Barrowlands for the BBC Radio 1's Rock Show programme was released as a B-side to the CD versions of the "Generator" single.

Two live versions were released on the Everywhere but Home DVD, recorded in Toronto and Reykjavík.

A live version filmed at Hyde Park on June 17, 2006, was released on the Live at Hyde Park DVD.

A live version filmed at Wembley Stadium on June 7, 2008, was released on the Live at Wembley Stadium DVD.

Track listing
UK CD1 white cover
"Breakout" - 3:21
"Iron and Stone" (The Obsessed cover) - 2:52
"Learn to Fly" (Live from Sydney, Australia, January 24, 2000) - 3:38

UK CD2 grey cover, Europe CD white cover
"Breakout" - 3:21
"Monkey Wrench" (Live from Melbourne, Australia February 1, 2000) - 4:23
"Stacked Actors" (Live from Sydney, Australia, January 24, 2000) - 5:21

Japanese version white cover
"Breakout"
"Iron & Stone" (The Obsessed cover)
"Ain't It the Life" (Live acoustic at 2 Meter Session, 22 Nov 1999)
"Learn to Fly" (Live from Sydney, Australia, January 24, 2000)
"Stacked Actors" (Live from Sydney, Australia, January 24, 2000)

Australia CD white cover
"Breakout"
"Monkey Wrench" (Live from Melbourne, Australia February 1, 2000)
"Next Year" (Live from Melbourne, Australia February 1, 2000)

Netherlands CD Live in Holland, part one
"Breakout
"Floaty" (Live acoustic at 2 Meter Session, 22 Nov 1999)
"Ain't it the Life" (Live acoustic at 2 Meter Session, 22 Nov 1999)
"Next Year" (Live acoustic at 2 Meter Session, 22 Nov 1999)

Personnel

Album
Dave Grohl – vocals, guitars
Nate Mendel – bass
Taylor Hawkins – drums

Video
Dave Grohl – vocals, guitar
Chris Shiflett – guitar, backing vocals
Nate Mendel – bass
Taylor Hawkins – drums

Chart positions

Certifications

References

1999 songs
2000 singles
Foo Fighters songs
Song recordings produced by Adam Kasper
Songs written by Dave Grohl
Music videos directed by The Malloys
Songs written by Nate Mendel
Songs written by Taylor Hawkins
American pop punk songs